The Herero and Namaqua genocide or the Herero and Nama genocide was a campaign of ethnic extermination and collective punishment waged by the German Empire against the Herero (Ovaherero) and the Nama in German South West Africa (now Namibia). It was the first genocide of the 20th century, occurring between 1904 and 1908.

In January 1904, the Herero people, who were led by Samuel Maharero, and the Nama people, who were led by Captain Hendrik Witbooi, rebelled against German colonial rule. On January 12, they killed more than 100 German settlers in the area of Okahandja, although women, children, missionaries and non-German Europeans were spared.

In August, German General Lothar von Trotha defeated the Ovaherero in the Battle of Waterberg and drove them into the desert of Omaheke, where most of them died of dehydration. In October, the Nama people also rebelled against the Germans, only to suffer a similar fate.

Between 24,000 and 100,000 Hereros and 10,000 Nama died in the genocide. The first phase of the genocide was characterised by widespread death from starvation and dehydration, due to the prevention of the Herero from leaving the Namib desert by German forces. Once defeated, thousands of Hereros and Namas were imprisoned in concentration camps, where the majority died of diseases, abuse, and exhaustion.

In 1985, the United Nations' Whitaker Report classified the aftermath as an attempt to exterminate the Herero and Nama peoples of South West Africa, and therefore one of the earliest attempts at genocide in the 20th century. In 2004, the German government recognised and apologised for the events, but ruled out financial compensation for the victims' descendants. In July 2015, the German government and the speaker of the Bundestag officially called the events a "genocide". However, it refused to consider reparations at that time. Despite this, the last batch of skulls and other remains of slaughtered tribesmen which were taken to Germany to promote racial superiority were taken back to Namibia in 2018, with Petra Bosse-Huber, a German Protestant bishop, describing the event as "the first genocide of the 20th century".

In May 2021, the German government agreed to pay €1.1 billion over 30 years to fund projects in communities that were impacted by the genocide.

Background 

The original inhabitants of what is now Namibia were the San and the Khoekhoe.

Herero, who speak a Bantu language, were originally a group of cattle herders who migrated into what is now Namibia during the mid-18th century. The Herero seized vast swaths of the arable upper plateaus which were ideal for cattle grazing. Agricultural duties, which were minimal, were assigned to enslaved Khoisan and Bushmen. Over the rest of the 18th century, the Herero slowly drove the Khoisan into the dry, rugged hills to the south and east.

The Hereros were a pastoral people whose entire way of life centred on their cattle. The Herero language, while limited in its vocabulary for most areas, contains more than a thousand words for the colours and markings of cattle. The Hereros were content to live in peace as long as their cattle were safe and well-pastured, but became formidable warriors when their cattle were threatened.

According to Robert Gaudi, "The newcomers, much taller and more fiercely warlike than the indigenous Khoisan people, were possessed of the fierceness that comes from basing one's way of life on a single source: everything they valued, all wealth and personal happiness, had to do with cattle. Regarding the care and protection of their herds, the Herero showed themselves utterly merciless, and far more 'savage' than the Khoisan had ever been. Because of their dominant ways and elegant bearing, the few Europeans who encountered Herero tribesmen in the early days regarded them as the region's 'natural aristocrats.

By the time of the Scramble for Africa, the area which was occupied by the Herero was known as Damaraland. The Nama were pastorals and traders and lived to the south of the Herero.

In 1883, Adolf Lüderitz, a German merchant, purchased a stretch of coast near Lüderitz Bay (Angra Pequena) from the reigning chief. The terms of the purchase were fraudulent, but the German government nonetheless established a protectorate over it. At that time, it was the only overseas German territory deemed suitable for European settlement.

Chief of the neighbouring Herero, Maharero rose to power by uniting all the Herero. Faced with repeated attacks by the Khowesin, a clan of the Khoekhoe under Hendrik Witbooi, he signed a protection treaty on 21 October 1885 with Imperial Germany's colonial governor Heinrich Ernst Göring (father of World War I flying ace and World War II convicted war criminal Hermann Göring) but did not cede the land of the Herero. This treaty was renounced in 1888 due to lack of German support against Witbooi but it was reinstated in 1890.

The Herero leaders repeatedly complained about violation of this treaty, as Herero women and girls were raped by Germans, a crime that the German judges and prosecuctors were reluctant to punish.

In 1890 Maharero's son, Samuel, signed a great deal of land over to the Germans in return for helping him to ascend to the Ovaherero throne, and to subsequently be established as paramount chief. German involvement in ethnic fighting ended in tenuous peace in 1894.

German colonial policy 
Both German colonial authorities and European settlers envisioned a predominately white "new African Germany," wherein the native populations would be put onto reservations and their land distributed among settlers and companies. Under German colonial rule, colonists were encouraged to seize land and cattle from the native Herero and Nama peoples and to subjugate them as slave laborers.

Resentment brewed among the native populations over their loss of status and property to German ranchers arriving in South West Africa, and the dismantling of traditional political hierarchies. Previously ruling tribes were reduced to the same status as the other tribes they had previously ruled over and enslaved. This resentment contributed to the Herero Wars that began in 1904.

Major Theodor Leutwein, the Governor of German South West Africa, was well aware of the effect of the German colonial rule on Hereros. He later wrote : "The Hereros from early years were a freedom-loving people, courageous and proud beyond measure. On the one hand, there was the progressive extension of German rule over them, and on the other their own sufferings increasing from year to year."

The Dietrich case 
In January 1903, a German trader named Dietrich was walking from his homestead to the nearby town of Omaruru to buy a new horse. Halfway to Dietrich's destination, a wagon carrying the son of a Herero chief, his wife, and their son stopped by. In a common courtesy in Hereroland, the chief's son offered Dietrich a ride.

That night, however, Dietrich got very drunk and after everyone was asleep, he attempted to rape the wife of the chief's son. When she resisted, Dietrich shot her dead. When he was tried for murder in Windhoek, Dietrich denied attempting to rape his victim. He alleged that he awoke thinking the camp was under attack and fired blindly into the darkness. The killing of the Herero woman, he claimed, was an unfortunate accident. The court acquitted him, alleging that Dietrich was suffering from "tropical fever" and temporary insanity.

According to Leutwein, the murder "aroused extraordinary interest in Hereroland, especially since the murdered woman had been the wife of the son of a Chief and the daughter of another. Everywhere the question was asked: Have White people the right to shoot native women?"

Governor Leutwein intervened. He had the Public Prosecutor appeal Dietrich's acquittal, a second trial took place (before the colony's supreme court), and this time Dietrich was found guilty of manslaughter and imprisoned. The move prompted violent objections of German settlers who considered Leutwein a "race traitor".

Rising tension 
In 1903, some of the Nama clans rose in revolt under the leadership of Hendrik Witbooi. A number of factors led the Herero to join them in January 1904.

One of the major issues was land rights. In 1903 the Herero learned of a plan to divide their territory with a railway line and set up reservations where they would be concentrated. The Herero had already ceded more than a quarter of their  territory to German colonists by 1903, before the Otavi railway line running from the African coast to inland German settlements was completed. Completion of this line would have made the German colonies much more accessible and would have ushered a new wave of Europeans into the area.

Historian Horst Drechsler states that there was discussion of the possibility of establishing and placing the Herero in native reserves and that this was further proof of the German colonists' sense of ownership over the land. According to Bridgman, there were racial tensions underlying these developments; the average German colonist viewed native Africans as a lowly source of cheap labour, and others welcomed their extermination.

A new policy on debt collection, enforced in November 1903, also played a role in the uprising. For many years, the Herero population had fallen in the habit of borrowing money from colonist moneylenders at extreme interest rates (see usury). For a long time, much of this debt went uncollected and accumulated, as most Herero had no means to pay. To correct this growing problem, Governor Leutwein decreed with good intentions that all debts not paid within the next year would be voided. In the absence of hard cash, traders often seized cattle, or whatever objects of value they could get their hands on, as collateral. This fostered a feeling of resentment towards the Germans on the part of the Herero people, which escalated to hopelessness when they saw that German officials were sympathetic to the moneylenders who were about to lose what they were owed.

Racial tension was also at play. The German settlers often referred to black Africans as "baboons" and treated them with contempt.

One missionary reported: "The real cause of the bitterness among the Hereros toward the Germans is without question the fact that the average German looks down upon the natives as being about on the same level as the higher primates ('baboon' being their favourite term for the natives) and treat them like animals. The settler holds that the native has a right to exist only in so far as he is useful to the white man. This sense of contempt led the settlers to commit violence against the Hereros."

The contempt manifested itself particularly in the concubinage of native women. In a practice referred to in Südwesterdeutsch as Verkafferung, native women were taken by male European traders and ranchers both willingly and by force.

Revolts 

In 1903, the Hereros saw an opportunity to revolt. At that time, there was a distant Khoisan tribe in the south called the Bondelzwarts, who resisted German demands to register their guns. The Bondelzwarts engaged in a firefight with the German authorities which led to three Germans killed and a fourth wounded. The situation deteriorated further, and the governor of the Herero colony, Major Theodor Leutwin, went south to take personal command, leaving almost no troops in the north.

The Herero revolted in early 1904, killing between 123 and 150 German settlers, as well as seven Boers and three women, in what Nils Ole Oermann calls a "desperate surprise attack".

The timing of their attack was carefully planned. After successfully asking a large Herero clan to surrender their weapons, Governor Leutwein was convinced that they and the rest of the native population were essentially pacified and so withdrew half of the German troops stationed in the colony. Led by Chief Samuel Maharero, the Herero surrounded Okahandja and cut railroad and telegraph links to Windhoek, the colonial capital. Maharero then issued a manifesto in which he forbade his troops to kill any Englishmen, Boers, uninvolved peoples, women and children in general, or German missionaries. The Herero revolts catalysed a separate revolt and attack on Fort Namutoni in the north of the country a few weeks later by the Ondonga.

A Herero warrior interviewed by German authorities in 1895 had described his people's traditional way of dealing with suspected cattle rustlers, a treatment which, during the uprising, was regularly extended to German soldiers and civilians, "We came across a few Khoisan whom of course we killed. I myself helped to kill one of them. First we cut off his ears, saying, 'You will never hear Herero cattle lowing.' Then we cut off his nose, saying, 'Never again shall you smell Herero cattle.' And then we cut off his lips, saying, 'You shall never again taste Herero cattle.' And finally we cut his throat."

According to Robert Gaudi, "Leutwein knew that the wrath of the German Empire was about to fall on them and hoped to soften the blow. He sent desperate messages to Chief Samuel Maherero in hopes of negotiating an end to the war. In this, Leutwein acted on his own, heedless of the prevailing mood in Germany, which called for bloody revenge."

The Hereros, however, were emboldened by their success and had come to believe that, "the Germans were too cowardly to fight in the open," and rejected Leutwein's offers of peace.

One missionary wrote, "The Germans are filled with fearful hate. I must really call it a blood thirst against the Hereros. One hears nothing but talk of 'cleaning up,' 'executing,' 'shooting down to the last man,' 'no pardon,' etc."

According to Robert Gaudi, "The Germans suffered more than defeat in the early months of 1904; they suffered humiliation, their brilliant modern army unable to defeat a rabble of 'half-naked savages.' Cries in the Reichstag, and from the Kaiser himself, for total eradication of the Hereros grew strident. When a leading member of the Social Democratic Party pointed out that the Hereros were as human as any German and possessed immortal souls, he was howled down by the entire conservative side of the legislature."

Leutwein was forced to request reinforcements and an experienced officer from the German government in Berlin. Lieutenant-General Lothar von Trotha was appointed commander-in-chief of South West Africa, arriving with an expeditionary force of 10,000 troops on 11 June.

Meanwhile, Leutwein was subordinate to the civilian Colonial Department of the Prussian Foreign Office, which was supported by Chancellor Bernhard von Bülow, while General Trotha reported to the military German General Staff, which was supported by Emperor Wilhelm II.

Leutwein wanted to defeat the most determined Herero rebels and negotiate a surrender with the remainder to achieve a political settlement. Trotha, however, planned to crush the native resistance through military force. He stated that:

By late spring of 1904, German troops were pouring into the colony. In August 1904, the main Herero forces were surrounded and crushed at the Battle of Waterberg.

Genocide 

In 1900, Kaiser Wilhelm II had been enraged by the killing of Baron Clemens von Ketteler, the Imperial German minister plenipotentiary in Beijing, during the Boxer Rebellion. The Kaiser took it as a personal insult from a people he viewed as racially inferior, all the more because of his obsession with the "Yellow Peril". On 27 July 1900, the Kaiser gave the infamous Hunnenrede (Hun speech) in Bremerhaven to German soldiers being sent to Imperial China, ordering them to show the Boxers no mercy and to behave like Attila's Huns. General von Trotha had served in China, and was chosen in 1904 to command the expedition to German South West Africa precisely because of his record in China. In 1904, the Kaiser was furious by the latest revolt in his colonial empire by a people whom he also viewed as inferior, and took the Herero rebellion as a personal insult, just as he had viewed the Boxers' assassination of Baron von Ketteler. The both tactless and bloodthirsty language that Wilhelm II used about the Herero people in 1904 is strikingly similar to the language he had used about the Chinese Boxers in 1900. However, the Kaiser denied, together with Chancellor von Bülow, von Trotha's request to quickly quell the rebellion.

No written order by Wilhelm II ordering or authorising genocide has survived. In February 1945 an Allied bombing raid destroyed the building housing all of the documents of the Prussian Army from the Imperial period. Despite this fact, surviving documents indicate that Trotha used the same tactics in Namibia that he had used in China, only on a much vaster scale. It is also known that throughout the genocide Trotha sent regular reports to both the General Staff and to the Kaiser. Historian Jeremy-Sarkin Hughes believes that regardless of whether or not a written order was given, the Kaiser must have given General von Trotha verbal orders. According to Hughes, the fact that Trotha was decorated and not court-martialed after the genocide became public knowledge lends support to the thesis that he was acting under orders. General von Trotha stated his proposed solution to end the resistance of the Herero people in a letter, before the Battle of Waterberg:

Trotha's troops defeated 3,000–5,000 Herero combatants at the Battle of Waterberg on 11–12 August 1904 but were unable to encircle and annihilate the retreating survivors.

The pursuing German forces prevented groups of Herero from breaking from the main body of the fleeing force and pushed them further into the desert. As exhausted Herero fell to the ground, unable to go on, German soldiers killed men, women, and children. Jan Cloete, acting as a guide for the Germans, witnessed the atrocities committed by the German troops and deposed the following statement:

A portion of the Herero escaped the Germans and went to the Omaheke Desert, hoping to reach British Bechuanaland; fewer than 1,000 Herero managed to reach Bechuanaland, where they were granted asylum by the British authorities. To prevent them from returning, Trotha ordered the desert to be sealed off. Some sources also state that the German colonial army systematically poisoned desert water wells. Maherero and 500–1,500 men crossed the Kalahari into Bechuanaland where he was accepted as a vassal of the Batswana chief Sekgoma.

On 2 October, Trotha issued a warning to the Herero:

He further gave orders that:

Trotha gave orders that captured Herero males were to be executed, while women and children were to be driven into the desert where their death from starvation and thirst was to be certain; Trotha argued that there was no need to make exceptions for Herero women and children, since these would "infect German troops with their diseases", the insurrection Trotha explained "is and remains the beginning of a racial struggle". After the war, Trotha argued that his orders were necessary, writing in 1909 that "If I had made the small water holes accessible to the womenfolk, I would run the risk of an African catastrophe comparable to the Battle of Beresonia."

The German general staff was aware of the atrocities that were taking place; its official publication, named Der Kampf, noted that:

Alfred von Schlieffen (Chief of the Imperial German General Staff) approved of Trotha's intentions in terms of a "racial struggle" and the need to "wipe out the entire nation or to drive them out of the country", but had doubts about his strategy, preferring their surrender.

Governor Leutwein, later relieved of his duties, complained to Chancellor von Bülow about Trotha's actions, seeing the general's orders as intruding upon the civilian colonial jurisdiction and ruining any chance of a political settlement. According to Professor Mahmood Mamdani from Columbia University, opposition to the policy of annihilation was largely the consequence of the fact that colonial officials looked at the Herero people as a potential source of labour, and thus economically important. For instance, Governor Leutwein wrote that:

Having no authority over the military, Chancellor Bülow could only advise Emperor Wilhelm II that Trotha's actions were "contrary to Christian and humanitarian principle, economically devastating and damaging to Germany's international reputation".

Upon the arrival of new orders at the end of 1904, prisoners were herded into labor camps, where they were given to private companies as slave labourers or exploited as human guinea pigs in medical experiments.

Concentration camps 

Survivors of the massacre, the majority of whom were women and children, were eventually put in places like Shark Island concentration camp, where the German authorities forced them to work as slave labour for German military and settlers. All prisoners were categorised into groups fit and unfit for work, and pre-printed death certificates indicating "death by exhaustion following privation" were issued. The British government published their well-known account of the German genocide of the Nama and Herero peoples in 1918.

Many Herero and Nama died of disease, exhaustion, starvation and malnutrition. Estimates of the mortality rate at the camps are between 45% and 74%.

Food in the camps was extremely scarce, consisting of rice with no additions. As the prisoners lacked pots and the rice they received was uncooked, it was indigestible; horses and oxen that died in the camp were later distributed to the inmates as food. Dysentery and lung diseases were common. Despite those conditions, the prisoners were taken outside the camp every day for labour under harsh treatment by the German guards, while the sick were left without any medical assistance or nursing care. Many Herero and Nama were worked to death.

Shootings, hangings, beatings, and other harsh treatment of the forced labourers (including use of sjamboks) were common. A 28 September 1905 article in the South African newspaper Cape Argus detailed some of the abuse with the heading: "In German S. W. Africa: Further Startling Allegations: Horrible Cruelty". In an interview with Percival Griffith, "an accountant of profession, who owing to hard times, took up on transport work at Angra Pequena, Lüderitz", related his experiences.

During the war, a number of people from the Cape (in modern-day South Africa) sought employment as transport riders for German troops in Namibia. Upon their return to the Cape, some of these people recounted their stories, including those of the imprisonment and genocide of the Herero and Nama people. Fred Cornell, an aspiring British diamond prospector, was in Lüderitz when the Shark Island concentration camp was being used. Cornell wrote of the camp:

Shark Island was the worst of the German South West African camps. Lüderitz lies in southern Namibia, flanked by desert and ocean. In the harbour lies Shark Island, which then was connected to the mainland only by a small causeway. The island is now, as it was then, barren and characterised by solid rock carved into surreal formations by the hard ocean winds. The camp was placed on the far end of the relatively small island, where the prisoners would have suffered complete exposure to the strong winds that sweep Lüderitz for most of the year.

German Commander Ludwig von Estorff wrote in a report that approximately 1,700 prisoners (including 1,203 Nama) had died by April 1907. In December 1906, four months after their arrival, 291 Nama died (a rate of more than nine people per day). Missionary reports put the death rate at 12–18 per day; as many as 80% of the prisoners sent to Shark Island eventually died there.

There are accusations of Herero women being coerced into sex slavery as a means of survival.

Trotha was opposed to contact between natives and settlers, believing that the insurrection was "the beginning of a racial struggle" and fearing that the colonists would be infected by native diseases.

Benjamin Madley argues that although Shark Island is referred to as a concentration camp, it functioned as an extermination camp or death camp.

Medical experiments and scientific racism 

Prisoners were used for medical experiments and their illnesses or their recoveries from them were used for research.

Experiments on live prisoners were performed by Dr. Bofinger, who injected Herero who were suffering from scurvy with various substances including arsenic and opium; afterwards he researched the effects of these substances via autopsy.

Experimentation with the dead body parts of the prisoners was rife. Zoologist  (1872–1955) noted taking "body parts from fresh native corpses" which according to him was a "welcome addition", and he also noted that he could use prisoners for that purpose.

An estimated 300 skulls were sent to Germany for experimentation, in part from concentration camp prisoners. In October 2011, after three years of talks, the first 20 of an estimated 300 skulls stored in the museum of the Charité were returned to Namibia for burial. In 2014, 14 additional skulls were repatriated by the University of Freiburg.

Number of victims 
A census conducted in 1905 revealed that 25,000 Herero remained in German South West Africa.

According to the Whitaker Report, the population of 80,000 Herero was reduced to 15,000 "starving refugees" between 1904 and 1907. In Colonial Genocide and Reparations Claims in the 21st Century: The Socio-Legal Context of Claims under International Law by the Herero against Germany for Genocide in Namibia by Jeremy Sarkin-Hughes, a number of 100,000 victims is given. Up to 80% of the indigenous populations were killed.

Newspapers reported 65,000 victims when announcing that Germany recognized the genocide in 2004.

Aftermath 

With the closure of concentration camps, all surviving Herero were distributed as labourers for settlers in the German colony. From that time on, all Herero over the age of seven were forced to wear a metal disc with their labour registration number, and banned from owning land or cattle, a necessity for pastoral society.

About 19,000 German troops were engaged in the conflict, of which 3,000 saw combat. The rest were used for upkeep and administration. The German losses were 676 soldiers killed in combat, 76 missing, and 689 dead from disease. The Reiterdenkmal in Windhoek was erected in 1912 to celebrate the victory and to remember the fallen German soldiers and civilians. Until after Independence, no monument was built to the killed indigenous population. It remains a bone of contention in independent Namibia.

The campaign cost Germany 600 million marks. The normal annual subsidy to the colony was 14.5 million marks. In 1908, diamonds were discovered in the territory, and this did much to boost its prosperity, though it was short-lived.

In 1915, during World War I, the German colony was taken over and occupied by the Union of South Africa, which was victorious in the South West Africa campaign. South Africa received a League of Nations mandate over South West Africa on 17 December 1920.

Link between the Herero genocide and the Holocaust 

The Herero genocide has commanded the attention of historians who study complex issues of continuity between the Herero genocide and The Holocaust. It is argued that the Herero genocide set a precedent in Imperial Germany that would later be followed by Nazi Germany's establishment of death camps.

According to Benjamin Madley, the German experience in South West Africa was a crucial precursor to Nazi colonialism and genocide. He argues that personal connections, literature, and public debates served as conduits for communicating colonialist and genocidal ideas and methods from the colony to Germany. Tony Barta, an honorary research associate at La Trobe University, argues that the Herero genocide was an inspiration for Hitler in his war against the Jews, Slavs, Romani, and others who he described as "non-Aryans".

According to Clarence Lusane, Eugen Fischer's medical experiments can be seen as a testing ground for medical procedures which were later followed during the Nazi Holocaust. Fischer later became chancellor of the University of Berlin, where he taught medicine to Nazi physicians. Otmar Freiherr von Verschuer was a student of Fischer, Verschuer himself had a prominent pupil, Josef Mengele. Franz Ritter von Epp, who was later responsible for the liquidation of virtually all Bavarian Jews and Roma as governor of Bavaria, took part in the Herero and Nama genocide as well.

Mahmood Mamdani argues that the links between the Herero genocide and the Holocaust are beyond the execution of an annihilation policy and the establishment of concentration camps and there are also ideological similarities in the conduct of both genocides. Focusing on a written statement by General Trotha which is translated as: 

Mamdani takes note of the similarity between the aims of the General and the Nazis. According to Mamdani, in both cases there was a Social Darwinist notion of "cleansing", after which "something new" would "emerge".

Reconciliation

Recognition 
In 1985, the United Nations' Whitaker Report classified the massacres as an attempt to exterminate the Herero and Nama peoples of South West Africa, and therefore one of the earliest cases of genocide in the 20th century.

In 1998, German President Roman Herzog visited Namibia and met Herero leaders. Chief Munjuku Nguvauva demanded a public apology and compensation. Herzog expressed regret but stopped short of an apology. He pointed out that international law requiring reparation did not exist in 1907, but he undertook to take the Herero petition back to the German government.

On 16 August 2004, at the 100th anniversary of the start of the genocide, a member of the German government, Heidemarie Wieczorek-Zeul, Germany's Federal Minister for Economic Development and Cooperation, officially apologised and expressed grief about the genocide, declaring in a speech that:

She ruled out paying special compensations, but promised continued economic aid for Namibia which in 2004 amounted to $14M a year. This number has been significantly increased since then, with the budget for the years 2016–17 allocating a sum total of €138M in monetary support payments.

The Trotha family travelled to Omaruru in October 2007 by invitation of the royal Herero chiefs and publicly apologised for the actions of their relative. Wolf-Thilo von Trotha said,

Negotiations and agreement 
The Herero filed a lawsuit in the United States in 2001 demanding reparations from the German government and Deutsche Bank, which financed the German government and companies in Southern Africa. With a complaint filed with the United States District Court for the Southern District of New York in January 2017, descendants of the Herero and Nama people sued Germany for damages in the United States. The plaintiffs sued under the Alien Tort Statute, a 1789 U.S. law often invoked in human rights cases. Their proposed class-action lawsuit sought unspecified sums for thousands of descendants of the victims, for the "incalculable damages" that were caused. Germany seeks to rely on its state immunity as implemented in US law as the Foreign Sovereign Immunities Act, arguing that, as a sovereign nation, it cannot be sued in US courts in relation to its acts outside the United States. In March 2019, the judge dismissed the claims due to the exceptions to sovereign immunity being too narrow for the case.

In September 2020, the Second Circuit stated that the claimants did not prove that money used to buy property in New York could be traced back to wealth resulting from the seized property and therefore the lawsuit could not overcome Germany's immunity. In June 2021, the Supreme Court declined to hear a petition to revive the case.

Germany, while admitting brutality in Namibia, at first refused to call it a "genocide", claiming that the term only became international law in 1945. However, in July 2015, then foreign minister Frank-Walter Steinmeier issued a political guideline stating that the massacre should be referred to as a "war crime and a genocide". Bundestag president Norbert Lammert wrote an article in Die Zeit that same month referring to the events as a genocide. These events paved the way for negotiations with Namibia.

In 2015, the German government began negotiations with Namibia over a possible apology, and by 2016, Germany committed itself to apologizing for the genocide, as well as to refer to the event as a genocide; but the actual declaration was postponed while negotiations stalled over questions of compensation.

On 11 August 2020, following negotiations over a potential compensation agreement between Germany and Namibia, President Hage Geingob of Namibia stated that the German government's offer was "not acceptable", while German envoy Ruprecht Polenz said he was "still optimistic that a solution can be found."

On 28 May 2021, the German government announced that it was formally recognizing the atrocities committed as a genocide, following five years of negotiations. The declaration was made by foreign minister Heiko Maas, who also stated that Germany was asking Namibia and the descendants of the genocide victims for forgiveness. In addition to recognizing the events as a genocide, Germany agreed to give as a "gesture of recognition of the immeasurable suffering" €1.1 billion in aid to the communities impacted by the genocide.

Following the announcement, the agreement needs to be ratified by both countries' parliaments, after which Germany would send its president, Frank-Walter Steinmeier, to officially apologize for the genocide. The nations agreed not to use the term "reparation" to describe the financial aid package.

The agreement was criticized by the chairman of the Namibian Genocide Association, Laidlaw Peringanda, who insisted that Germany should purchase their ancestral lands back from the descendants of the German settlers and return it to the Herero and Nama people. The agreement was also criticized because negotiations were held solely between the German and Namibian governments, and did not include representatives of the Herero and Nama people.

Repatriation 
Peter Katjavivi, a former Namibian ambassador to Germany, demanded in August 2008 that the skulls of Herero and Nama prisoners of the 1904–1908 uprising, which were taken to Germany for scientific research to claim the superiority of white Europeans over Africans, be returned to Namibia. Katjavivi was reacting to a German television documentary which reported that its investigators had found more than 40 of these skulls at two German universities, among them probably the skull of a Nama chief who had died on Shark Island near Lüderitz. In September 2011, the skulls were returned to Namibia. In August 2018, Germany returned all of the remaining skulls and other human remains which were examined in Germany to scientifically promote white supremacy. This was the third such transfer, and shortly before it occurred, German Protestant bishop Petra Bosse-Huber stated "Today, we want to do what should have been done many years ago – to give back to their descendents the remains of people who became victims of the first genocide of the 20th century."

On 17 May 2019, as a part of the repatriation process, the German government announced that it would return a stone symbol which it took from Namibia in the 1900s.

Media 
A BBC documentary, Namibia – Genocide and the Second Reich (2005), explores the Herero and Nama genocide and the circumstances surrounding it.
In the documentary 100 Years of Silence, filmmakers Halfdan Muurholm and Casper Erichsen portray a 23-year-old Herero woman, who is aware of the fact that her great-grandmother was raped by a German soldier. The documentary explores the past and the way Namibia deals with it now.
Mama Namibia, a historical novel by Mari Serebrov, provides two perspectives of the 1904 genocide in German South West Africa. The first is that of Jahohora, a 12-year-old Herero girl who survives on her own in the veld for two years after her family is killed by German soldiers. The second story in Mama Namibia is that of Kov, a Jewish doctor who volunteered to serve in the German military to prove his patriotism. As he witnesses the atrocities of the genocide, he rethinks his loyalty to the Fatherland.
Thomas Pynchon's novel V. (1963) had a chapter that included recollections of the genocide; there are memories of events that took place in 1904 in various locations, including the Shark Island concentration camp.
Jackie Sibblies Drury's play, We Are Proud To Present a Presentation About the Herero of Namibia, Formerly Known as Southwest Africa, From the German Südwestafrika, Between the Years 1884–1915, is about a group of actors developing a play about the Herero and Nama genocide.

See also 

 Genocides in history (before World War I)
 Genocide of indigenous peoples
 List of ethnic cleansing campaigns
 List of genocides
 Atrocities in the Congo Free State, perpetrated in the Congo Free State (not universally recognized as a genocide)
 Maji Maji Rebellion, German East Africa (modern-day Tanzania)
 Scramble for Africa

Original German texts

References

Sources

Bibliography and documentaries 

 
 
 
 Exterminate all the Brutes, Sven Lindqvist, London, 1996.
 A Forgotten History-Concentration Camps were used by Germans in South West Africa, Casper W. Erichsen, in the Mail and Guardian, Johannesburg, 17 August 2001.
 German Federal Archives, Imperial Colonial Office, Vol. 2089, 7 (recto)
 "The Herero and Nama Genocides, 1904–1908", J.B. Gewald, in Encyclopedia of Genocide and Crimes Against Humanity, New York, Macmillan Reference, 2004.
 Herero Heroes: A Socio-Political History of the Herero of Namibia 1890–1923, J.B. Gewald, Oxford, Cape Town, Athens, OH, 1999.
 Let Us Die Fighting: the Struggle of the Herero and Nama against German Imperialism, 1884–1915, Horst Drechsler, London, 1980.
 
 
 

 The war and massacre is significantly featured in The Glamour of Prospecting, a contemporary account by Frederick Cornell of his attempts to prospect for diamonds in the region. In the book he describes his first hand accounts of witnessing the concentration camp on Shark Island and other aspects of the genocide.

External links 

 Official German apologies

 
1904 in Africa
1904 establishments in German South West Africa
1908 disestablishments in German South West Africa
Anti-black racism in Africa
African resistance to colonialism
Conflicts in 1904
Genocides in Africa
Ethnic cleansing in Africa
Genocide of indigenous peoples
German South West Africa
German war crimes
Germany–Namibia relations
Guerrilla wars
Herero people
Herero Wars
Medical experimentation on prisoners
Rebellions in Africa
Wars involving Germany
January 1904 events
Mass murder in 1904